Alzon is a commune in the Gard department in southern France.

The commune is located in the south of the Cévennes National Park, in the upper Vis river valley.

Geography

Climate

Alzon has a oceanic climate (Köppen climate classification Cfb) closely bordering on a warm-summer Mediterranean climate (Csb).

Population

Sights
 Arboretum de Cazebonne

See also
Communes of the Gard department
Waitangi, Chatham Islands, the antipode of Alzon

References

Communes of Gard